Aucke van der Werff  (born 3 September 1953 in Schettens) is a Dutch politician of the Christian Democratic Party (CDA). He currently is mayor of Noordoostpolder.

Van der Werff was a teacher of English. From 1990 to 1998, he was a member of the municipal council of Wymbritseradiel and subsequently an alderman till 2002. In 2003, he became mayor of het Bildt. In 2010, he became mayor of Noordoostpolder.

References 
  www.noordoostpolder.nl

1953 births
Living people
Aldermen in Friesland
Christian Democratic Appeal politicians
Dutch educators
Mayors in Flevoland
Municipal councillors in Friesland
People from Het Bildt
People from Noordoostpolder
People from Wûnseradiel